Fairfield High School is an Academy secondary school  in Horfield, Bristol, England. The schools catchment area is Horfield, Lockleaze and Eastville.

History

 
In 2000, against a background of opposition by Bristol City Council to selective education and declining academic results, Fairfield closed as a grammar school and reopened as a comprehensive, being renamed Fairfield High School. In 2006, the new school moved to new purpose-designed buildings at Stottbury Road, Bristol. One reason for the move was that the existing site had room for only some five hundred pupils, a number which was considered to be too low.

Academic achievement
The school has improved its results year on year and achieved its best ever GCSE scores in 2012, the table below shows the percentage of students hitting the key measure of 5 A*-C including English and Mathematics.

Notable former pupils
Victor Eyles FRSE, geologist and science historian
Cary Grant, actor
Peter Holmström, musician
Laya Lewis, actress
Alex Beresford, weatherman

References

External links

Secondary schools in Bristol
Academies in Bristol
Educational institutions established in 2000
2000 establishments in England